Caritas Hong Kong is a charitable organisation, a member of Caritas Internationalis, founded by the Catholic Diocese of Hong Kong in July 1953.  It started with relief and rehabilitation services to the poor and the distressed after the Second World War.  It nowaday expands to involve social service, education service, medical service, hospitality service and many others. It is led by Board of Management chairman Dominic Chan.

It is funded by the Hong Kong Government, Community Chest, other donations and fees on participants.

Hospitals
Public:
 Caritas Medical Centre, founded in 1964
Private
 Precious Blood Hospital (Caritas), taken up in 1993
 Canossa Hospital (Caritas), taken up in 1991

Schools

Special Education & Vocational Training Service
Caritas Lok Jun School 

Caritas Lok Yi School

Caritas Lok Kan School 

Caritas Resurrection School

Caritas Magdalene School

Caritas Jockey Club Lok Yan School

Vocational Training & Education Service

Caritas Secondary School
Caritas St. Francis Secondary School

Caritas Chong Yuet Ming Secondary School 

Caritas St. Joseph Secondary School 

Caritas St. Paul Secondary School

Caritas Tuen Mun Marden Foundation Secondary School

Caritas Chai Wan Marden Foundation Secondary School 

Caritas Shatin Marden Foundation Secondary School

Caritas Fanling Chan Chun Ha Secondary School

Caritas Yuen Long Chan Chun Ha Secondary School

Caritas Ma On Shan Secondary School

Caritas Charles Vath College

Adult and Higher Education Service 
Caritas Institute of Higher Education (formerly Caritas Francis Hsu College)

Caritas Bianchi College of Careers (Day and Night School) 

 Caritas Institute of Community Education
Caritas St. Joseph's Institute For Further and Adult Education- Night School

Centre For Advanced & Professional Studies

Caritas Cosmetic Career Centre

Caritas Adult & Higher Education Service – City Centre

Education & Retraining Information Network For New Arrivals

Caritas Information Technology Advancement Centre 

Caritas Human Resources Investment Section 

Caritas Logistics Centre

Environmental Protection Initiative
Hong Kong Caritas Computer Recycle Project

See also
List of non-governmental organizations in the People's Republic of China

References

External links

An interview with the Archbishop Emeritus Joseph Zen Ze-kiun on YouTube  

 
1953 establishments in Hong Kong
Christian organizations established in 1953
Charities based in Hong Kong